L38 may refer to:
 60S ribosomal protein L38, a human protein
 Hightown, Merseyside postcode